Taveau Church, also known as Tavou Church, is a historic church located near Cordesville, Berkeley County, South Carolina. It was built about 1835, and is a small clapboard Classical Revival structure on a low brick pier foundation.  It has a gable roof with a wooden bell tower. The front façade features a small pedimented portico supported by four slender wooden Doric columns.

It was added to the National Register in 1978.

References

Churches on the National Register of Historic Places in South Carolina
Churches completed in 1835
Neoclassical architecture in South Carolina
Churches in Berkeley County, South Carolina
National Register of Historic Places in Berkeley County, South Carolina
Neoclassical church buildings in the United States